The 2008 NCAA Men's Water Polo Championship was the 40th annual NCAA Men's Water Polo Championship to determine the national champion of NCAA men's collegiate water polo. Tournament matches were played at the Avery Aquatic Center in Stanford, California from December 6–7, 2008.

USC defeated Stanford in the final, 7–5, to win their fourth national title. The undefeated Trojans (29–0) were coached by Jovan Vavic. This would go on to become the first of USC's record six straight national championships (2008–2013). 

The Most Outstanding Player of the tournament was J.W. Krumpholz from USC. Additionally, two All-Tournament Teams were named: a First Team (with seven players, including Krumpholz) and a Second Team (also with ninth players).

The tournament's leading scorer, with 6 goals, was Kyle Wertz from Navy.

Qualification
Since there has only ever been one single national championship for water polo, all NCAA men's water polo programs (whether from Division I, Division II, or Division III) were eligible. A total of 4 teams were invited to contest this championship.

Bracket
Site: Avery Aquatic Center, Stanford, California

All-tournament teams

First Team 
J.W. Krumpholz, USC (Most outstanding player)
Shea Buckner, USC
Tim Hummel, Loyola Marymount
Matt Sagehorn, USC
Andy Stevens, Loyola Marymount
Drac Wigo, Stanford
Sage Wright, Stanford

Second Team 
Tibor Forai, Loyola Marymount
Tim Heafner, Loyola Marymount
Will Hindle-Katel, Stanford
Peter Kurzeka, USC
Arjan Ligtenberg, USC
Mike Mulvey, Navy
Jimmie Sandman, Stanford
Jovan Vranes, USC
Janson Wigo, Stanford

See also 
 NCAA Men's Water Polo Championship
 NCAA Women's Water Polo Championship

References

NCAA Men's Water Polo Championship
NCAA Men's Water Polo Championship
2008 in sports in California
December 2008 sports events in the United States
2008